Gary Albert Ella (born 23 July 1960) is an Australian former rugby union player. Ella represented Australia six times between 1982 and 1988.

Gary recently (2022) moved to Morisset Park NSW and has joined forces with first-grade coach Seru Rainima at Lake Macquarie Rugby Club. Gary will work with Seru and mainly look after the backline coaching.

References

1960 births
People educated at Matraville Sports High School
Indigenous Australian rugby union players
Australian rugby union coaches
Australian rugby union players
Leinster Rugby non-playing staff
Living people
Australia international rugby union players
Rugby union players from Sydney
Rugby union centres